Zeng Jinlian (June 26, 1964 – February 13, 1982) was the tallest woman verified in modern times, surpassing Jane Bunford's record. In the year between Don Koehler's death and her own, she surpassed fellow "eight-footers" Gabriel Estêvão Monjane and Suleiman Ali Nashnush.

See also 
 List of tallest people

References

External links

People from Yiyang
People with gigantism
1964 births
1982 deaths